An annual award for Best Achievement in Music - Original Score is presented by the Academy of Canadian Cinema and Television to the best Canadian original score for the previous year. Prior to 2012, the award was presented as part of the Genie Awards; since 2012 it has been presented as part of the expanded Canadian Screen Awards.

1970s

1980s

1990s

2000s

2010s

2020s

See also
 Prix Iris for Best Original Music

References

Film awards for best score
 
Original Score